Stefan Janus (1910–1978),  DSO, DFC was a Polish fighter ace of the Polish Air Force in World War II with 6 confirmed kills.

Biography

Early life
Janus was born in Wola Duchacka near Cracow in 1910. In 1931 he was drafted into army and sent to Volyn Cadet School for Artillery Reserve Officers (Wołyńska Szkoła Podchorążych Rezerwy Artylerii) in Włodzimierz Wołynski. One year later he was assigned to 7th Artillery Regiment in Czestochowa. Then he studied at the artillery school in Torun. On 15 August 1934 Janus was named second lieutenant (podporucznik).

After his promotion, Janus volunteered for Polish Air Force Academy in Dęblin. In 1935 he was ordered to the 2nd Air Regiment in Cracow where he flew light bomber and reconnaissance aircraft Breguet 19. In 1936 he was sent to flight school in Grudziadz and graduated as fighter pilot. Then he came back to Cracow where he flew PZL P.7. Since October 1938 Janus served as instructor in Air Force Academy.

World War II
During the Invasion of Poland Janus was evacuated to Hungary via Romania. He was interned in Nagykáta but on 26 October he escaped and arrived in France via Yugoslavia and Greece. In November 1939 he came to the Air Training Centre in Lyon. In February 1940 he was sent to North Africa. After the Battle of France Janus arrived in the UK.

Initially he was assigned to the No. 308 Polish Fighter Squadron where he flew Hurricanes. From May 1941 Janus flew Spitfires over Europe. In July 1941 he was attacked by three Bf 109s and shot down one of them. In late September he downed another Messerschmitt and in late October he destroyed two German planes. The next month Janus took command of the No. 315 Polish Fighter Squadron. In December 1941 he became a fighter ace downing his 5th plane. In April 1942 he took command of the No. 131 Wing RAF. He scored his last victory on 26 July 1942.

Janus participated in the Dieppe Raid. He received his Distinguished Service Order for the command in operation.

On 26 January 1943 over France, Janus collided with another plane. He jumped with a parachute. Captured by Germans he was sent to Stalag Luft III. He tried to escape on 15 August with a group of prisoners. One of them spoke fluent German, had a stolen uniform and a fake ID. Unfortunately guards sounded the alarm. Janus was liberated in May 1945.

Post-war career
Janus came back to the UK on 9 May 1945 and was sent on leave to convalesce. On 17 September he returned to service. In early 1947 he joined the Polish Resettlement Corps. Janus served in the RAF until 1965. In the same year he had a Myocardial infarction and was sent into retirement.

Stefan Janus died on 11 November 1978.

Awards
 Virtuti Militari, Silver Cross 
 Cross of Valour (Poland), four times
 Air Force Medal for War 1939-45 (Poland)
 Distinguished Flying Cross (United Kingdom)
 Distinguished Service Order

References

Further reading
 
 Tadeusz Jerzy Krzystek, Anna Krzystek: Polskie Siły Powietrzne w Wielkiej Brytanii w latach 1940-1947 łącznie z Pomocniczą Lotniczą Służbą Kobiet (PLSK-WAAF). Sandomierz: Stratus, 2012, s. 239. 
 Piotr Sikora: Asy polskiego lotnictwa. Warszawa: Oficyna Wydawnicza Alma-Press. 2014, s. 309-312. 
 Józef Zieliński: Asy polskiego lotnictwa. Warszawa: Agencja lotnicza ALTAIR, 1994, s. 46. 

The Few
Polish World War II flying aces
Recipients of the Silver Cross of the Virtuti Militari
Recipients of the Cross of Valour (Poland)
1978 deaths
1910 births
Burials at Rakowicki Cemetery
Polish prisoners of war
World War II prisoners of war held by Germany
Polish emigrants to the United Kingdom